Sharpe Creek is a stream in the U.S. state of Georgia. It is a tributary to the Little Tallapoosa River.

Sharpe Creek derives its name from Uncle Hiram Sharp, a pioneer settler. A variant name is "Sharps Creek".

References

Rivers of Georgia (U.S. state)
Rivers of Carroll County, Georgia